Amery High School is a public school serving grades 9 through 12 in Amery, Polk County, Wisconsin, United States.

Notable people
Annie Lobert, activist and missionary
Gae Magnafici, member of the Wisconsin State Assembly
Dwight York, stand-up comedian

Athletics
Amery has 16 different sports for boys and girls to participate in.
The sports include: Baseball, Basketball, Cross Country, Dance, Football, Golf, Hockey, Soccer, Softball, Tennis, Track and Field, Volleyball, and Wrestling. The new athletic director is Jeff Fern.

Clubs and Student Organizations
Amery has 22 different clubs and organizations for students to participate in. The clubs and organizations include: American (School Yearbook), Art Club, Chess Club, Colorguard, The Warrior (Student Online Newspaper), Equine Club, FCCLA, French club, FBLA, FFA, Jazz Band, Marching Band, Jazz Choir, National Honor Society, Quiz Bowl, School Store, Solo & Ensemble Competition, Spanish Club, STARS, Student Council, VAC, Skills USA.

The Warrior
The Warrior is a student run newspaper for Amery High School sponsored by local businesses.

References

External links
Amery School District
www.amery.com
City of Amery

Public high schools in Wisconsin
Schools in Polk County, Wisconsin